Alba Nydia Díaz (born April 27, 1955) is a Puerto Rican actress who has worked in Puerto Rico and Mexico.

Early years
Díaz was born in Caguas, Puerto Rico.

Acting career on television

Acting career on stage

Producer
Díaz has her own film production company called Copelar, with her actress partner Sonia Valentín.

Television host
Díaz hosted the daily talk show  (Among Us) with actresses Valentin and Noris Joffre, among other personalities. It was broadcast by Televicentro in Puerto Rico and WAPA America, throughout the United States.

Filmography

References

External links
 

1955 births
Living people
People from Caguas, Puerto Rico
Puerto Rican emigrants to Mexico
Puerto Rican film actresses
Puerto Rican soap opera actresses
Puerto Rican stage actresses
Puerto Rican telenovela actresses
Puerto Rican television actresses